The 2005–06 season was Chelsea F.C.'s 92nd competitive season, 14th consecutive season in the Premier League and 100th year as a club. Managed by José Mourinho, Chelsea marked their Centenary season by winning the Premier League title for the second consecutive year after defeating their closest challengers Manchester United 3–0 at Stamford Bridge on 29th April 2006. They also won the Community Shield.

Chelsea continued spending vast sums of money in their third season under the ownership of Roman Abramovich, signing Michael Essien from Lyon and Shaun Wright-Phillips from Manchester City for more than £20 million each.

In the Champions League, Chelsea aimed to improve upon their second straight semi-final placing the previous year, but exited the competition in the first knockout round to FC Barcelona. In the FA Cup, they managed to improve on their third-round exit in the previous season, but fell short in the semi-final, losing 2–1 to Liverpool. After winning the League Cup in the previous season, they failed to defend their title by taking an early third-round exit to Charlton Athletic on penalties.

The season was momentous for Chelsea's record-breaking start to the Premier League season where they won their opening nine games in a row, which is the best start to a Premier League season by any side.  The Blues proceeded to claim 20 wins from their first 22 league games, the strongest start recorded to a title defence in the Premier League era. Upon retaining their Champion status, Chelsea equalled the record for most victories within a league season (29), matching their total from the previous year. As of 2020, Chelsea 2005–06 hold joint Premier League records for most wins at home in a season (18) and fewest home defeats in a season (0). They were also the first Premier League team to win against every other opposition team in a season.

Team kits
Supplier: Umbro / Sponsor: Samsung Mobile

The team kit for the season was produced by Umbro and the shirt sponsor was Samsung Mobile, who replaced previous shirt sponsor Emirates Airlines. Chelsea's new home kit was all blue with gold accents. Their new away kit was light blue with black shorts and black accents. Their 3rd kit was similar to their away kit from the 2004–05 season, black with grey shorts and grey accents. The only difference was the addition of the new shirt sponsor and new club crest with modifications.

Management

First team squad
Squad at end of season

Left club during season

Transfers

In

Out

Overall transfer activity

Total spending
Summer:  £58,400,000

Winter:  £0,000,000

Total:  £58,400,000

Income
Summer:  £22,600,000

Winter:  £0,000,000

Total:  £22,600,000

Expenditure
Summer:  £35,800,000

Winter:  £0,000,000

Total:  £35,800,000

Competitions

FA Community Shield

Premier League

Upon winning the 2005–06 Premier League season, Chelsea clinched their third national league title.

League table

Results summary

Results by round

Matches

UEFA Champions League

Group stage

Knockout phase

Round of 16

League Cup

FA Cup

Statistics

|}
Statistics:. 
Squad details and shirt numbers:

Starting 11
Considering starts in all competitions.

Summary

References

External links
 Chelsea FC Official Website
 Chelsea FC on Soccerbase

Chelsea F.C. seasons
Chelsea
2006